Daniele Stefanoni (born 28 August 1966) is an Italian pararower, twice bronze medal winner at the World Rowing Championships.

Biography
Stefanoni participated in three editions of the Paralympic Games, one winters (2006) and two summers (2008 and 2012).

Achievements

References

External links
 

1966 births
Living people
Italian male rowers
Paralympic athletes of Italy